Ciyantang is a small town in the north west Hunan province of China

References

Longshan County
Towns of Xiangxi Tujia and Miao Autonomous Prefecture